Neszmély is a village in Komárom-Esztergom county, Hungary.

The Holy Roman Emperor Albert II of Germany died in this village

External links
 Street map (Hungarian)

Populated places in Komárom-Esztergom County